Bengali ( Bangla) is one of the Eastern Indo-Aryan (Magadhan) languages, evolved from Magadhi Prakrit and Pali languages native to the Indian subcontinent. The core of Bengali vocabulary is thus etymologically of Magadhi Prakrit and Pali languages. However, centuries of major borrowing and reborrowing from Arabic, Persian, Turkish, Sanskrit, Austroasiatic languages and other languages has led to the adoption of a wide range of words with foreign origins; thus making the origins of borrowed and re-borrowed words in the Bengali vocabulary numerous and diverse, due to centuries of contact with various languages.

Classifications of origin types
The typical Bengali dictionary lists 75,000 separate words, of which 50,000 (67%) are considered to be তদ্ভব tôdbhôbô (native Bengali vocabulary with Sanskrit cognates),  21,100 (28%) are তৎসম tôtsômô (words directly re-borrowed from Sanskrit), and the rest being borrowings from দেশী deshi "indigenous (Austroasiatic)" and বিদেশী bideshi "foreign" sources. There are more than five lac Bengali vocabulary in this language overall including other languages which is used as Bengali.

However, these figures do not take into account the fact that a huge chunk of these words are archaic or highly technical, minimising their actual usage. The productive vocabulary used in modern literary works, in fact, is made up mostly 67% of native tôdbhôbô words, while tôtsômô re-borrowings only make up 25% of the total. Deshi and bideshi borrowings together make up the remaining 8% of the vocabulary used in modern Bengali literature.

Differences in vocabulary

This table below compares the differences of spoken and used Bengali vocabularies in Dhaka (Bangladesh) & Shantipur (West Bengal, India).

Examples of borrowed words
Due to centuries of contact with Mughals, Arabs, Persians, Europeans, and East Asians, the Bengali language has absorbed countless words from foreign languages, often totally integrating these borrowings into the core vocabulary. The most common borrowings from foreign languages come from three different kinds of contact. After centuries of contact from Persia and the Middle East, followed by the invasions of the Mughal Empire, numerous Turkish, Arabic, and Persian words were absorbed and fully integrated into the lexicon. Later, East Asian travellers and European colonialism brought words from Portuguese, French, Dutch, and most significantly English. Some very common borrowings are shown below.

Sanskrit (সংস্কৃত Sôṁskr̥tô)

Austroasiatic (Munda) languages (দেশী Deśi “Native”)

Foreign (বিদেশি Bideśī)

Persian (ফারসি Pharsi)

Arabic (আরবি Arbi)

Turkish (তুর্কি Turki)

Portuguese (পর্তুগিজ Pôrtugij)

Dutch (ওলন্দাজ Olôndaj)

English (ইংরেজি Iṁreji)

French (ফরাসি Phôrasi)

Greek (গ্রীক Grīk)

Chinese (চীনা Cīna)

Japanese (জাপানি Japani/নিহোঙ্গো Nihoṅgo)

Burmese (বর্মী Bôrmī)

Spanish (স্পেনীয় Spenīẏô)

German (জার্মান Jarman)

Italian (ইতালীয় Italīẏô)

Australian (অস্ট্রেলিয় Ôsṭrelīẏô)

References 

Bengali language
Languages of India
Languages of Bangladesh